Servi camerae regis (Latin: "servants of the royal chamber", German: Kammerknechtschaft) was the status of the Jews in Christian Europe in the Middle Ages. The ruler had the right to tax them for the benefit of his treasury (camera regis), but at the same time he had a duty to protect them when they were in danger from others. The Laws of Edward the Confessor enacted in England in the 12th century defined the status of the Jews as follows:

This status is found in several areas of Christian Europe during the Middle Ages. For example, in 1236 Frederick II, Holy Roman Emperor announced in Regensberg and Worms that all Jews in Germany belonged to the emperor's fiscus. Frederick also determined the extent of Jewish civil rights and their ability to work for Christians or hire Christians.

See also
Court Jew
Schutzjude
Leibzoll

References

 Roth, Cecil (1997). "Antisemitism". Encyclopedia Judaica (CD-ROM Edition Version 1.0). Ed. Cecil Roth. Keter Publishing House. 

History of the Jews in Europe
Latin words and phrases
Latin legal terminology
Court Jews
Disabilities (Jewish) in Europe